Mark Rowlands (born 1962) is a Welsh writer and philosopher. He is Professor of Philosophy at the University of Miami, and the author of several books on the philosophy of mind, the moral status of non-human animals, and cultural criticism. He is known within academic philosophy for his work on the animal mind and is one of the principal architects of the view known as vehicle externalism, or the extended mind, the view that thoughts, memories, desires and beliefs can be stored outside the brain and the skull. His works include Animal Rights (1998), The Body in Mind (1999), The Nature of Consciousness (2001), Animals Like Us (2002), and a personal memoir, The Philosopher and the Wolf (2008).

Rowlands was born in Newport, Wales and began his undergraduate degree in engineering at the University of Manchester before changing to philosophy. He took his doctorate in philosophy from the University of Oxford, and has held various academic positions in philosophy in Britain, Ireland and the United States.

His best known work is his international best-selling memoir, The Philosopher and the Wolf, about the decade he spent living and travelling with a wolf. As Jonathan Derbyshire wrote in his Guardian review, "it is perhaps best described as the autobiography of an idea, or rather a set of related ideas, about the relationship between human and non-human animals." Julian Baggini wrote in the Financial Times that it was "a remarkable portrait of the bond that can exist between a human being and a beast." Mark Vernon writing in The Times Literary Supplement added that it "could become a philosophical cult classic."

Bibliography
Supervenience and Materialism, Ashgate, 1995.
Animal Rights: A Philosophical Defence, Macmillan/St Martin's Press, 1998. 
The Body in Mind: Understanding Cognitive Processes, Cambridge University Press, 1999. 
The Environmental Crisis: Understanding the Value of Nature, Macmillan/St Martin's Press, 2000.
The Nature of Consciousness, Cambridge University Press, 2001. 
Animals Like Us, Verso, 2002. 
Externalism: Putting Mind and World Back Together Again, Acumen/McGill-Queen's University Press, 2003. 
The Philosopher at the End of the Universe, Ebury/Random House, 2003 ; retitled Sci-Phi: Philosophy from Socrates to Schwarzenegger, 2nd edition 
Everything I Know I Learned From TV: Philosophy for the Unrepentant Couch Potato, Ebury/Random House, 2005 
Body Language: Representing in Action, MIT Press, 2006.
Fame, Acumen 2008. 
The Philosopher and the Wolf, Granta, 2008. 
The New Science of the Mind, MIT Press, 2010. 
Can Animals be Moral? Oxford University Press, 2012 
Running with the Pack, Granta, 2013

See also
 List of animal rights advocates

References

Further reading
"Mark Rowlands interview: The company of wolves", The Scotsman, 20 November 2008.
Fiske-Harrison, Alexander. 'On philosophers and wolves', Prospect, 22 January 2009
Hafner, Michael. "The Philosopher, the Wolf, the Dog and the Fleas", The Mashazine, 10 November 2009.
Gray, John. 'The Nature Of The Beast', Literary Review, 12 December 2008

External links 

 Mark Rowlands blog

Living people
1962 births
20th-century British philosophers
20th-century Welsh educators
20th-century Welsh writers
21st-century British philosophers
21st-century Welsh educators
21st-century Welsh writers
British animal rights scholars
British male writers
Philosophers of mind
Welsh philosophers
Male non-fiction writers